Boualong Boungnavong (born 3 June 1959) is a Laotian sprinter. She competed in the women's 200 metres at the 1980 Summer Olympics.

References

External links
 

1959 births
Living people
Athletes (track and field) at the 1980 Summer Olympics
Laotian female sprinters
Olympic athletes of Laos
Place of birth missing (living people)
Olympic female sprinters